The W. A. Gruninger Building is a commercial building located in Kingman, Arizona. It was evaluated for National Register listing as part of a 1985 study of 63 historic resources in Kingman that led to this and many others being listed.

Description 
W. A. Gruninger Building is located at 424 Beale Street in Kingman, Arizona. The building was designed and built by Gruninger & Son in 1921 in an Early Commercial style.  Gruninger & Son built it as an investment property. The first floor was a store front for rent. The second floor had office space. The Gruningers had their own office there. Today the building is still used for a store and office space for the downtown area of Kingman. The building was added to the National Register of Historic Places in 1986.

References

Commercial buildings completed in 1921
Buildings and structures in Kingman, Arizona
Commercial buildings on the National Register of Historic Places in Arizona
National Register of Historic Places in Kingman, Arizona